Bolshaya Sinega is a rural locality (a village) in Krasavinskoye Rural Settlement, Velikoustyugsky District, Vologda Oblast, Russia. The population was 45 as of 2002.

Geography 
Bolshaya Sinega is located 23 km northeast of Veliky Ustyug (the district's administrative centre) by road. Vasilyevskoye is the nearest rural locality.

References 

Rural localities in Velikoustyugsky District